Sania may refer to:

 Sania, a popular female name
 A clan of the Bharwad people of India